Michael Amadio (born May 13, 1996) is a Canadian professional ice hockey centre for the Vegas Golden Knights of the National Hockey League (NHL). Amadio was selected by the Los Angeles Kings, 90th overall, in the 2014 NHL Entry Draft.

Playing career

Major junior
Amadio was a prolific scorer playing in Northern Ontario's bantam and midget levels, before he was selected by the Brampton Battalion, 36th overall in the 2012 Ontario Hockey League Priority Selection. He played two seasons with the Battalion, through their relocation to North Bay, before he was selected with the last pick in the third-round of the 2014 NHL Entry Draft by the Los Angeles Kings.

During the 2015–16 season, Amadio scored a franchise record of 50 goals and was nominated for the Red Tilson Trophy and William Hanley Trophy. Amadio was named the winner of the William Hanley Trophy on April 22, 2016, and was later selected for the OHL Second All-Star Team.

Professional
On March 13, 2016, Amadio was signed by the Kings to a three-year, entry-level contract. He was then reassigned to join AHL affiliate, the Ontario Reign for their playoff run following the 2015–16 season. In 11 post-season games he contributed with 1 goal and 5 points.

After beginning the 2017–18 season with the Reign, Amadio received his first recall to the Kings on October 26, 2017. He made his NHL debut that night in a 4–0 shutout victory over the Montreal Canadiens. In his fourth game, Amadio registered his first NHL goal, scoring in a 5–3 victory over the Toronto Maple Leafs on November 2, 2017.

After attending the Kings training camp, Amadio was named to their NHL roster to begin the 2018–19 season. After playing in 28 games, Amadio was reassigned to the Ontario Reign. Despite recalls throughout the season, he was again assigned to the Ontario Reign after the Kings failed to clinch a post season berth.

On March 29, 2021, during his fifth season within the Kings organization in the shortened  campaign, Amadio was traded to the Ottawa Senators in exchange for Christian Wolanin. He made 5 appearances with the Senators following the trade, registering 1 assist.

As a free agent at the conclusion of his contract with the Senators, Amadio was signed to a one-year, two-way contract with the Toronto Maple Leafs on July 29, 2021. Amadio made the Maple Leafs opening night roster to commence the  season, going without a point in 3 games on the fourth-line. On October 29, 2021, Amadio was placed on waivers by the Maple Leafs and claimed the following day by the Vegas Golden Knights. On January 30, 2022, the Golden Knights signed Amadio to a two-year, $1.525 million contract extension.

Career statistics

Awards and honours

References

External links
 

1996 births
Living people
Brampton Battalion players
Canadian ice hockey centres
Ice hockey people from Ontario
Los Angeles Kings draft picks
Los Angeles Kings players
North Bay Battalion players
Ontario Reign (AHL) players
Ottawa Senators players
Sportspeople from Sault Ste. Marie, Ontario
Toronto Maple Leafs players
Vegas Golden Knights players